Danger International is a role-playing game published by Hero Games in 1985.

Description
Danger International is a contemporary adventure system with rules for characters such as spies, detectives, investigative reporters, and paramilitary mercenaries. Basically an expansion and revision of Espionage!, this game uses the Hero System of rules and thus is compatible with all Hero Games RPGs. Combat has both quick, basic rules and slower, more detailed advanced rules. The game includes rules for concealment, vehicle combat, modern equipment, and the modern political world, plus an introductory solo scenario and an espionage scenario for a group, "Night of the Ninja".

Publication history
Danger International was designed by L. Douglas Garrett, George MacDonald and Steve Peterson, with cover art by Denis Loubet, and was published in 1985 by Hero Games as a 176-page book.

Reviews
Different Worlds #44
 Casus Belli #37 (April 1987)

References

Contemporary role-playing games
Espionage role-playing games
Hero System
Role-playing games introduced in 1985